The Challenger Biel/Bienne is a professional tennis tournament played on indoor hard courts. It is currently part of the ATP Challenger Tour. It is held annually in Biel/Bienne, Switzerland since 2021.

Past finals

Singles

Doubles

References

ATP Challenger Tour
Hard court tennis tournaments
Tennis tournaments in Switzerland
Biel/Bienne
Recurring sporting events established in 2021